An autonomous republic is a type of administrative division similar to a province or state. A significant number of autonomous republics can be found within the successor states of the Soviet Union, but the majority are located within Russia.  Many of these republics were established during the Soviet period as Autonomous Soviet Socialist Republics, or ASSRs.

Autonomous republics within the former republics of the Soviet Union

Republics of Russia
Azerbaijan: Nakhchivan Autonomous Republic 
Georgia: Adjara, Abkhazia (currently controlled by the pro-Russian separatist government of the Republic of Abkhazia) 
Ukraine: Crimea (disputed with and occupied by Russia)
Uzbekistan: Karakalpakstan
Tajikistan: Gorno-Badakhshan

Eastern Europe
 Autonomous Republic of Northern Epirus
 Comrat Republic (1906, self-proclaimed)
 Republic of Tamrash

French territories
The designation also can refer to the following 16 former French territories in Africa before 1960, when all gained independence, except for Djibouti, which voted in a referendum to remain part of France as an overseas department:
 Tunisia (1954)
 Togolese Republic (February 22, 1958)
 Malagasy Republic, today known as the Republic of Madagascar (October 14, 1958)
 Mali Federation, formed by the Sudanese Republic (now the Republic of Mali) and the Republic of Senegal (November 24, 1958)
 The Republic of the Congo, referred at the time as Middle Congo (November 28, 1958)
 Islamic Republic of Mauritania (November 28, 1958)
 Republic of Chad (November 28, 1958)
 Gabonese Republic (November 28, 1958)
 Ubangi-Shari, referred today as the Central African Republic (December 1, 1958)
 Republic of Dahomey, current Republic of Benin (December 4, 1958)
 Republic of Ivory Coast (December 4, 1958)
 Republic of Upper Volta, current Burkina Faso (December 11, 1958)
 Republic of Niger (December 19, 1958)
 Republic of Cameroon (January 1, 1960), unified with the British Cameroon a year later
 State of the Comoros (1961)
 Territory of the Afars and the Issas, known today as the Republic of Djibouti (1967)
 Republic of Cochinchina (1946-1949)

Dutch Autonomous Republic
The Designation before 1950 Independence Day, when Indonesia gained independence:
 United States of Indonesia (December 27, 1949)

See also
Autonomous administrative division

External links

Types of administrative division